Evdilek  is a village in Erdemli district of Mersin Province, Turkey. It is situated in the Taurus Mountains. It is a remote village of the district. The population of Evdilek was 140 as of 2012. Evdilek is a high altitude village, and until recently, it was only a yayla which was unpopulated during the winters. In 2006, it was declared a village, but its winter population remains low. The main economic activity of Evdilek is animal breeding, but fruit production is on the rise.

References

Villages in Erdemli District